The Conway Formation is a Campanian to Danian geologic formation in the South Island of New Zealand and therefore crosses the Cretaceous–Paleogene boundary. Plesiosaur remains are among the fossils that have been recovered from its strata. The Conway Formation is part of the Eyre Group and Haerenga Supergroup.

Fossil content 
Among others, the following fossils have been found in the formation:
 Alexandronectes zealandiensis
 Onchopristis dunklei
 Taniwhasaurus oweni

See also 
 Tahora Formation
 Plesiosaur stratigraphic distribution
 Geology of Canterbury, New Zealand
 Stratigraphy of New Zealand
 South Polar region of the Cretaceous

References

Further reading 
 M. W. Caldwell, R. Holmes, G. L. Bell, Jr. and J. Wiffen. 2005. An unusual tylosaurine mosasaur from New Zealand: a new skull of Taniwhasaurus oweni (Lower Haumurian; Upper Cretaceous). Journal of Vertebrate Paleontology 25(2):393-401
 J. P. O'Gorman, R. A. Otero, and N. Hiller. 2014. A new record of an aristonectine elasmosaurid (Sauropterygia, Plesiosauria) from the Upper Cretaceous of New Zealand: implications for the Mauisaurus haasti Hector, 1874 hypodigm. Alcheringa
 R. A. Otero, J. P. O'Gorman, N. Hiller, F. R. O'Keefe, and R. E. Fordyce. 2016. Alexandronectes zealandiensis gen. et sp. nov., a new aristonectine plesiosaur from the lower Maastrichtian of New Zealand. Journal of Vertebrate Paleontology 36(2):e1054494:1-14
 G. Warren and I. Speden. 1977. The Piripauan and Haumurian stratotypes (Mata Series, Upper Cretaceous) and correlative sequences in the Haumuri Bluff District, South Marlborough. New Zealand Geological Survey Bulletin 92:1-60

Geologic formations of New Zealand
Cretaceous System of Oceania
Campanian Stage
Maastrichtian Stage
Sandstone formations
Siltstone formations
Fossiliferous stratigraphic units of Oceania
Paleontology in New Zealand
Canterbury, New Zealand